The Maicuru Biological Reserve, is a strictly protected biological reserve in the state of Pará, Brazil.

Location

The reserve lies between the Maicuru and Jari rivers on the border between the states of Pará and Amapá.
It includes parts of the basins of the Maicuru, Paru and Jari rivers.
The park is mostly within the municipality of Almeirim (94.49%) with a small part in the municipality of Monte Alegre (5.51%).
It is part of the mosaic of protected areas known as the Calha Norte do rio Amazonas.
It adjoins the Tumucumaque Indigenous Park, Rio Paru d'Este Indigenous Territory, Tumucumaque Mountains National Park and Paru State Forest.

Almost all the reserve is in the Paru-Jari basin formed by the  Itapecuru, Ipitinga, Careparu, Paru and Jarí rivers.
The south of the reserve is in the Cuminapanema-Maicuru basin, formed by the Maicurú, Curuá, Mamiá, Cuminapanema and Jauaru rivers.
The reserve is accessible only by small aeroplane through landing strips in four mining areas in the south-central portion and one in the north-central portion.

History

The reserve was created by state decree 2610 of 4 December 2006 with the objectives of preserving the natural environment and ecosystem, supporting scientific research and supporting environmental education. The conservation unit is fully protected.
As a biological reserve the purpose is to provide full protection without human interference and allow only indirect use of the natural resources. Public access is prohibited except for educational purposes as defined by the management plan, and scientific research requires prior approval by the Pará Secretary of State for the Environment (SEMA/PA).
The reserve is in the Center of Guiana Endemism, which spans parts of Brazil, Venezuela, Guyana, French Guiana and Suriname.
It may be considered a "mega reserve", aiming to protect a complete sample of species with the space needed to perpetuate themselves over the generations.

The Management Plan was prepared by Conservation International with the assistance of the Museu Paraense Emílio Goeldi and the Institute of Man and Environment in the Amazon, and technical analysis from SEMA.
The plan describes the physical, biological and socio-economic aspects of the landscape, and provides a full plan for managing it.
The management plan was published and took effect in 2011.
The management councils of the Maicuru Biological Reserve and the Grão Pará Ecological Station were formed on 6–7 March 2013.
The conservation unit is supported by the Amazon Region Protected Areas Program.

Environment

The reserve has a tropical monsoon climate, with temperature between  most of the year, high humidity and high rainfall.

The reserve is almost all covered by dense submontane rainforest (98.24%), with some transition forest (0.96%) and Cerrado (0.04%).
There is no record of human pressure in 98.5% of the reserve, but an area covering 1.5% of the reserve hot spots indicate medium pressure.
The reserve contains various endemic and endangered species of flora and fauna.
88 species of fish have been recorded, 31 amphibians, 34 reptiles, 302 birds including the vulnerable crested eagle (Morphnus guianensis) and 33 mammals including the endangered jaguar (Panthera onca), cougar (Puma concolor) and giant anteater (Myrmecophaga tridactyla).
88 species of ferns have been recorded and 306 of flowering plants.

Notes

Sources

2006 establishments in Brazil
Protected areas of Pará
Biological reserves of Brazil
Protected areas established in 2006